Elavur is a village in the Tiruvallur district of Tamil Nadu, India. It is located in the Gummidipoondi taluk border between Tamil Nadu and Andhra pradesh. NH16 Chennai-Kolkata Highway. India's First modern Integrated Check post opened by Tamil Nadu chief minister and also located frontline medical village. ELR is and railway station code for Elavur.

Transport 

Elavur lies on the National Highway 16 (India) from Chennai to Calcutta, which is a part of Golden Quadrilateral Highway project. It is located at 25 km from Tada, 100 km from Nellore, 26 km from Satyavedu, and 55 km from Chennai.Various buses pass through GNT road from Tirupati, Srikalahasti, Nellore, Naidupeta, Sullurpeta to Madhavaram Mofussil Bus Terminus (MMBT) and Chennai Mofussil Bus Terminus (CMBT). Elavur railway station is located between Chennai–Kolkata rail road stretch trains towards Chennai Central to Sullurpeta and Chennai Central to Nellore trains. Near by railway station is Gummidipoondi located.
Most of TNSTC , APSRTC and TSRTC Buses are well connected to Chennai, Ponneri, Srikalahasti, Nellore, Naidupeta, Sullurpeta through Elavur.

Educational institutions 
Schools
Sri Jayaram Institute of Engg & Technology.
Valliammaal CBSE school, 
Vivekandha Matric. Hr. Sec. School, 
Govt. Hr. Sec School
Sagunthalammal Matric School.

Languages
Tamil is the official language for the people of Elavur and People will speak Telugu,Hindi,Odia.

Demographics 

According to the 2011 census of India, Elavur has 1452 households. The effective literacy rate (i.e. the literacy rate of population excluding children aged 6 and below) is 59.64%.

References 

Villages in Gummidipoondi taluk